Cory Schmitz is a New York-based graphic designer. His works include logo designs, posters for many popular video games-related brands and companies, such as Oculus Rift, PlayStation, Polygon, My Famicase Exhibition, Insomniac Games and many more.

References

External links 
 Official Website

American graphic designers
Video game culture
Living people
Year of birth missing (living people)